Ahwiren is a town in the Ashanti Region of Ghana. The town is known for the Saint Joseph Secondary/Technical School.  The school is a second cycle institution.

References

Populated places in the Ashanti Region